Im Kwon-taek (born December 8, 1934) is one of South Korea's most renowned film directors. In an active and prolific career, his films have won many domestic and international film festival awards as well as considerable box-office success, and helped bring international attention to the Korean film industry. As of spring 2015, he has directed 102 films.

Early life
Im Kwon-taek was born in Jangseong, Jeollanam-do and grew up in Gwangju. After the Korean War, he moved to Busan in search of work. He then moved to Seoul in 1956, where Jeong Chang-hwa, director of Five Fingers of Death (1972), offered him room and board for work as a production assistant. Jeong recommended him for directing in 1961.

Career
Im's directorial premiere was with the 1962 film, Farewell to the Duman River (Dumanganga jal itgeola).

Before 1980 he was known primarily as a commercial filmmaker who could efficiently direct as many as eight genre pictures a year, helping to fulfill the quota for domestic pictures set by the government . His desire to make more artistically satisfying films began to show itself with his 1978 film Jokbo (Genealogy or The Family Tree), but the turning point of his career came with the 1981 film Mandala. From this point his films have been regarded as art-house cinema, and have been regularly shown at international film festivals, and have won numerous awards.

Im has continued to explore themes from Korea's past while also focusing on the Korean cultural identity in modern times. Among Im's most notable recent films are Sopyonje (1993) and Chunhyang (2000), both of which concentrate on the traditional Korean musical art of pansori. The latter film was also based on a traditional Korean legend. Apart from being a critical success, Sopyonje was also a success at the box office, becoming the first domestic film to draw over a million viewers in Seoul alone. Chihwaseon (2002) was also a critical success, earning him Korea's first Best Director award at the Cannes Film Festival. Im Kwon-taek was awarded an Honorary Golden Bear award at the Berlin Film Festival in 2005.

Im Kwon-taek's status, brought on by the critical success of his films, overlapped with a period of the film movement called "New Korean Cinema" or "Korean New Wave". Along with other directors, such as Park Gwang-su and Jang Sun-woo, Im is recognized as one of the founding figures of the movement, which gained international critical recognition and acclaim for Korean Cinema.

In April 2007, Im released his 100th film Beyond the Years, an informal sequel to Sopyonje. In November 2007 the French government announced that it would make Im a knight of the French Legion of Honor.

In 2013, a museum dedicated to Im opened in Busan, on the Dongseo University Centum City Campus.

A documentary on Im, Cloud, Encore (2018) by well-known film critic-turned-director Jung Sung-il, will made its world premiere at the 23rd Busan International Film Festival in 2018.

Personal life
He married the actress Chae Ryeong (ko), who appeared in several of his films. Their two sons Im Dong-joon and Im Dong-jae (the latter uses the stage name Kwon Hyun-sang) are also active in the film industry.

Filmography

Accolades
Asian Film Awards:
Lifetime Achievement Award
Asia Pacific Film Festival
Special Jury Award Chunhyang (2000)
Best Director and Best Film Sibaji (1987)
Berlin International Film Festival
Golden Bear: Gilsoddeum (nominated) (1986)
Golden Bear: The Taebaek Mountains (nominated) (1995)
Honorary Golden Bear (2005)
Cannes Film Festival
Best Director Chihwaseon (2002)
Grand Bell Awards (Korea), Best Director
Testimony (Jungon) (1974)
Jokbo (Genealogy/Family Tree) (1979)
Mandala (1981)
Ticket (1986)
Yeonsan ilgi (Diary of King Yonsan) (1988)
Hankuk Play and Film Arts Awards (Korea), Best Director
Wangshibri (A Byegone Romance) (1976)
Nakdongkaneun heureuneunga (Commando on the Nakdong River) (1976)
Angae maeul (Village in the Mist) (1983)
Hawaii International Film Festival
Best Feature Film Chunhyang (2000)
International Film Festival of India
Lifetime Achievement Award
Korean Film Critics Awards, Best Director
Gilsoddeum (Gilsodom) (1986)
Ticket (1986)
16th Moscow International Film Festival
Golden St. George: Come Come Come Upward (1989) (nominated)
Busan International Film Festival
Netpac Award Chunhyang (2000)
The Asian Filmmaker of the Year (2021)
San Francisco International Film Festival
Akira Kurosawa Award (1998)
Shanghai International Film Festival
Golden Goblet - Best Director Seopyeonje (1993)
Singapore International Film Festival
2001 Silver Screen Award - Best Asian Director Chunhyang (2000)
2014 Silver Screen Award - Honorary Award

Notes

See also
Cinema of Korea

 Legion of Honour
 List of Legion of Honour recipients by name (I)
 Legion of Honour Museum

External links and references

Page about the Korean New Wave at asianinfo.org
Biography and interview at cinekorea.com

Interview: Reflection In A Mirror at asianfilms.org

, p. 342-343.
 Naver Cast - Im Kwon-taek
 Doosan Encyclopedia - Im Kwon-taek

1936 births
Chevaliers of the Légion d'honneur
Living people
South Korean film directors
People from Jangseong County
Cannes Film Festival Award for Best Director winners
Fellini Gold Medalists
Honorary Golden Bear recipients
Recipients of the Ho-Am Prize in the Arts
Best Director Paeksang Arts Award (film) winners